Alasdhair McFarlane (born 29 August 1984 in Scotland), is a former Scottish U21 and Scotland Club XV international rugby union player, formerly of Glasgow Warriors. McFarlane played at Scrum-Half.

Amateur career

McFarlane played for Hillhead Jordanhill before moving on to play for Glasgow Hutchesons Aloysians. When he joined Glasgow Warriors he also played for Ayr.

Professional career

He was with the Warriors in season 2004-05. He played against Sale Sharks on 20 August 2004.  He made the squad away to Newport Gwent Dragons in January 2005; home to Ospreys that same month but did not play; and away to Munster Rugby in February 2005  where he came on a substitute for Graeme Beveridge in his competitive debut in the Celtic League.

In season 2005-06, McFarlane was again playing for Glasgow Warriors. He came on as sub in their match against Rotherham Titans.

He started the next Warriors match against Edinburgh Rugby.

He was named in the Warriors Heineken Cup squad for their campaign in Europe that season.

International career

McFarlane played for the Scotland Under 21 side, playing in the Under 21 World Cup for Scotland.

He was later capped for Scotland Club XV.

References

1984 births
Living people
Scottish rugby union players
Glasgow Warriors players
Ayr RFC players
Glasgow Hutchesons Aloysians RFC players
Hillhead Jordanhill players
Scotland Club XV international rugby union players
Rugby union scrum-halves